Mukhtar Badirkhanovich Mukhtarov (born 6 January 1986) is a Kazakh former footballer of Azeri and Turkish roots who played as a centre back.

Club Career Stats 
Last update: 8 November 2017

References

External links 

 

1986 births
Living people
Kazakhstani people of Turkish descent
Kazakhstani people of Azerbaijani descent
Kazakhstani footballers
Kazakhstani expatriate footballers
Kazakhstan international footballers
Association football defenders
Kazakhstan Premier League players
FC Astana players
Khazar Lankaran FK players
FC Ordabasy players
Expatriate footballers in Azerbaijan
People from Lankaran
People from Shymkent